China International Communications Group (CICG) is a foreign-language publishing and communications organization headquartered in Beijing, China, and owned and operated by the Central Propaganda Department of the Chinese Communist Party (CCP). Established in October 1949 as the China International Publishing Group, it has developed into a global media corporation.

Organization 
CICG owns seven subordinate publishing houses, i.e. Foreign Languages Press, New World Press, Morning Glory Publishers, Sinolingua, China Pictorial Publishing House, Dolphin Books, and New Star Publishers. The organization annually publishes over 3,000 titles of books and around 50 journals in more than 10 languages. Notable periodicals include Beijing Review, China Today, China Pictorial, People’s China, and China Report. Its subsidiary, the China International Book Trading Corporation, is in charge of the distribution.

It also runs 20 overseas branches in countries and regions, including the United States, Britain, Germany, Japan, Belgium, Egypt, Mexico, and the Hong Kong Special Administrative Region, with about 3,000 staff members, including around 100 foreign workers.

In addition to publishing, CICG operates the China Internet Information Center. It is also responsible for the implementation and management of the national translation test and appraisal for the Ministry of Human Resources and Social Security.

Employees 
Prominent people who have worked in the CICG include Nobel Literature Prize-winning novelist and playwright Gao Xingjian, Nobel Prize-nominated poet Bei Dao, actor and politician Ying Ruocheng (known for his role in the Oscar-winning The Last Emperor), translators Yang Xianyi and Ye Junjian, author Xiao Qian, non-fiction novel writer Xu Chi, cartoonist Ding Cong, former Chinese Foreign Minister Qiao Guanhua, and former UN Undersecretary General (1972-1979) Tang Mingzhao.

Several foreign employees have also gained notoriety, including the pseudonymous author "Alex Hill," whose account of working as a foreign editor for the organization was widely read in 2015. In his account, the author writes of feckless bureaucracy, political correctness, and a general feeling of malaise among the many foreigners working in the compound.

See also
  (CPG)

References 

Mass media in China
Publishing companies of China
Organizations associated with the Chinese Communist Party
Chinese propaganda organisations

External links 

 
One institution with multiple names